Margaret Court defeated Rosie Casals 6–1, 6–2 to win the women's singles tennis title at the 1969 New South Wales Open.

Judy Tegart was the defending champion but lost in the quarter-finals to Billie Jean King.

Draw

Finals

References
 1969 New South Wales Open Draw

1969,Women's Singles
1969 in Australian tennis